Urzhum (Vürzym or , Üržüm) is a town and the administrative center of Urzhumsky District in Kirov Oblast, Russia, located on the left bank of the Urzhumka River about  from its confluence with the Vyatka River. Population:

History
It was first mentioned in 1554 as a Mari town. The town was named after the river, although the name has no reliable etymology. In 1584, Urzhum was refounded as a Russian fortress with the aim of keeping down Mari and Tatar revolts. Town status was granted to it in 1796.

Administrative and municipal status
Within the framework of administrative divisions, Urzhum serves as the administrative center of Urzhumsky District. As an administrative division, it is incorporated within Urzhumsky District as the Town of Urzhum. As a municipal division, the Town of Urzhum is incorporated within Urzhumsky Municipal District as Urzhumskoye Urban Settlement.

Notable people
Sergey Kirov, statesman
Nikolay Zabolotsky, poet

References

Notes

Sources

External links
Unofficial website of Urzhum

Cities and towns in Kirov Oblast
Urzhumsky Uyezd